A list of films produced in Egypt in 1961. For an A-Z list of films currently on Wikipedia, see :Category:Egyptian films.

References

External links
 Egyptian films of 1961 at the Internet Movie Database
 Egyptian films of 1961 elCinema.com

Lists of Egyptian films by year
1961 in Egypt
Lists of 1961 films by country or language